Ennore railway station is one of the railway stations of the Chennai Central–Gummidipoondi section of the Chennai Suburban Railway Network. It serves the neighbourhood of Ennore, a suburb of Chennai, and is located 16 kilometres north of Chennai Central railway station. It has an elevation of 7 metres above sea level.

History

The lines at the station were electrified on 13 April 1979, with the electrification of the Chennai Central–Gummidipoondi section.

Traffic
About 15,000 people uses the station every day.

See also

 Chennai Suburban Railway
 Railway stations in Chennai

References

External links
 Ennore station at Indiarailinfo.com

Stations of Chennai Suburban Railway
Railway stations in Chennai
Railway stations in Tiruvallur district